Lake Khantayskoye is a lake in Krasnoyarsk Krai, Russia.

It is located south of Lake Keta.

See also
List of lakes of Russia

References

Khantayskoye